Samir Muratović (born 25 February 1976) is a Bosnian retired professional footballer.

After finishing his playing career, Muratović spent more than two years as head scout of Austrian Bundesliga club Sturm Graz from July 2017 to September 2019. From May 2019 until December 2020, he worked as the sporting director of Bosnian Premier League club Tuzla City.

Club career
Muratović started his career at Drina Zvornik. He then moved to Turkey for Kocaelispor. In 1999, he moved back to Bosnia and Herzegovina and signed with Željezničar of the First League of Bosnia and Herzegovina. Muratović then had a short spell at Chemnitzer FC and then moved to Russian Premier League club Saturn Ramenskoye.

In January 2004, he moved to Grazer, until summer 2007, when the club was relegated.

From 2007 to 2012, he played for Sturm Graz. In 2012, he moved to Gratkorn. In 2013, Muratović left Gratkorn and shortly after ended his playing career.

International career
He made his debut for Bosnia and Herzegovina in a January 1999 friendly match away against Malta and has earned a total of 24 caps, scoring no goals. On 5 March 2014, he played his last match for the national team in a friendly match against Egypt at Tivoli-Neu in Innsbruck, Austria.

Administrative career
On 3 July 2017, Muratović became the new head scout of his former club, Sturm Graz. He left Sturm in September 2019, after more than two years of him being the head scout of Sturm.

On 29 May 2019, he was named new sporting director of Bosnian Premier League club Tuzla City. Muratović terminated his contract with the club on 15 December 2020.

Honours

Player
Željezničar
Bosnian Cup: 1999–2000

Grazer
Austrian Bundesliga: 2003–04
Austrian Cup: 2003–04

Sturm Graz 
Austrian Bundesliga: 2010–11
Austrian Cup: 2009–10
UEFA Intertoto Cup: 2008 (Joint Winner)

References

External links

1976 births
Living people
People from Zvornik
Association football midfielders
Bosnia and Herzegovina footballers
Bosnia and Herzegovina international footballers
FK Drina Zvornik players
Kocaelispor footballers
FK Željezničar Sarajevo players
Chemnitzer FC players
FC Saturn Ramenskoye players
Grazer AK players
SK Sturm Graz players
FC Gratkorn players
First League of the Republika Srpska players
Süper Lig players
Premier League of Bosnia and Herzegovina players
2. Bundesliga players
Russian Premier League players
Austrian Football Bundesliga players
Austrian Regionalliga players
Bosnia and Herzegovina expatriate footballers
Expatriate footballers in Turkey
Bosnia and Herzegovina expatriate sportspeople in Turkey
Expatriate footballers in Germany
Bosnia and Herzegovina expatriate sportspeople in Germany
Expatriate footballers in Russia
Bosnia and Herzegovina expatriate sportspeople in Russia
Expatriate footballers in Austria
Bosnia and Herzegovina expatriate sportspeople in Austria